The 2017 EuroLeague Final Four was the concluding EuroLeague Final Four tournament of the 2016–17 EuroLeague season, the 60th season of Europe's premier level club basketball tournament, and the 17th season since it is organised by Euroleague Basketball. It was the 30th Final Four of the modern EuroLeague Final Four era (1988–present), and the 32nd time overall that the competition was concluded with a final four format. The Final Four was played at the Sinan Erdem Dome in Istanbul, Turkey, in May 2017. Fenerbahçe won its first EuroLeague title.

Venue
On September 27, 2016, Euroleague Basketball announced that the Final Four will be held in the Sinan Erdem Dome in Istanbul. It has a seating capacity of 22,500 for concerts, for the sport of basketball and tennis it has a seating capacity of 16,647 people, making it Turkey's largest multi-purpose indoor venue and the third largest in Europe (although it is not the third largest in Europe in capacity for basketball use). The arena is named after Sinan Erdem (1927–2003), who was the President of the Turkish Olympic Committee, from 1989, until his death in 2003.

Bracket

Semifinals

Semifinal B

Semifinal A

Third place game
CSKA Moscow won the penultimate game of the tournament, securing third place over Real Madrid and ending the campaign with the best overall record – twenty-six wins and nine defeats. A significant factor to their win was a superior three-point shooting rate. CSKA lead from the start, taking five points before a reply from Real, and ended the first quarter with a 23–10 lead. There was nothing between teams during the second and third quarters, allowing CSKA to maintain their thirteen-point lead into the final quarter. CSKA added to their score and pulled away from Real to finish with a score of 94–70.

Championship game
Fenerbahçe played in its second consecutive championship game, after it lost to CSKA Moscow in 2016. Olympiacos returned to the title game for the first time since 2015.

The first two quarters were evenly matched. Fenerbahçe  opened the scoring and led by 5–1 before Olympiacos replied with five unanswered points. They relinquished the lead soon after and were unable to regain it for the remainder of the game. Fenerbahçe took an eight-point lead over Olympiacos after the first quarter, with a score of 26–18, though Olympiacos had reduced the deficit to five points, to 39–34, by half time. Fenerbahçe broke away in the third quarter, taking a commanding twelve point lead to go into the fourth quarter 60–48 up. An 11–2 run by Fenerbahçe at the start of the final quarter effectively secured the title for the club. The game ended with a score of 80–64. Fenerbahçe led at each quarter on its way to the title, and head coach Željko Obradović added to his record total of nine EuroLeague championships. Fenerbahçe became the first Turkish club to win the EuroLeague championship.

Bogdan Bogdanović and Nikola Kalinić both scored the most points, with 17 each, while Ekpe Udoh set a EuroLeague championship game record of five blocks. Udoh was also named EuroLeague Final Four MVP.

References

External links
 Official website

Final Four
2017
2017
2017 in Istanbul
2016–17 in Turkish basketball
International basketball competitions hosted by Turkey
May 2017 sports events in Europe
Sport in Bakırköy